James Maxwell may refer to:

Arts and entertainment 
James Maxwell (actor) (1929–1995), American-British actor and theatre director
Jim Maxwell (commentator) (born 1950), Australian sports commentator
Jimmy Maxwell (bandleader) (born 1953), musician and bandleader
Jimmy Maxwell (trumpeter) (1917–2002), American trumpeter
James Maxwell  (1838–1893), architect, one of the founders of Maxwell and Tuke

Science and medicine 
James Clerk Maxwell (1831–1879), Scottish physicist and proponent of Maxwell's equations
James Maxwell (colonial administrator) (1869–1932), British physician and colonial administrator
James Laidlaw Maxwell Jr (1876–1951), English Presbyterian medical missionary to China, son of James Laidlaw Maxwell

Sport 
James Maxwell (cricketer) (1883–1967), English cricket
James Maxwell (footballer, born 1887) (1887–1917), Scottish footballer
James Maxwell (footballer, born 1900) (1900–1964), Scottish footballer
Bud Maxwell (James Morton Maxwell, 1913–1990), Scottish footballer
James Maxwell (footballer, born 2001), Scottish footballer
Jim Maxwell (American football) (born 1981), American football linebacker
Jimmy Maxwell (footballer) (1889–1916), Irish footballer

Other fields 
James Maxwell, 9th Baron Farnham (1813–1896), British nobleman
James Maxwell (British Marines officer) (died 1792)
James Maxwell (poet) (1720–1800), Scottish poet and essayist
James Maxwell (scholar) (c.1581 – in or after 1635), Scottish author
James Laidlaw Maxwell (1836–1921), missionary to Formosa
James Shaw Maxwell (1855–1928), Scottish socialist
James Francis Maxwell (1862–1941), politician in Queensland, Australia
James D. Maxwell II (born 1975), Mississippi judge
James Maxwell, 1st Earl of Dirletoun (died 1650), Scottish courtier